New Holland is a global full-line agricultural machinery manufacturer. Founded in 1895 as an American company, today it is an Italian brand. New Holland agricultural products include tractors, combine harvesters, balers, forage harvesters, self-propelled sprayers, haying tools, seeding equipment, hobby tractors, utility vehicles and implements, and grape harvesters.

The original New Holland Machine Company was founded in 1895 in New Holland, Pennsylvania; it was acquired by Sperry Corporation in 1947, then by Ford Motor Company in 1986, and then by FiatAgri in 1991, becoming a full-line producer. In 1999, New Holland became a brand of CNH Global (NYSE: CNH), which was majority-owned by Fiat Industrial. On 29 September 2013, CNH Global N.V. and Fiat Industrial S.p.A. were merged into CNH Industrial N.V., a company incorporated in the Netherlands. Fiat Industrial shareholders received one CNH Industrial common share for every Fiat Industrial share held and CNH Global shareholders received 3.828 CNH Industrial common shares for every CNH Global common share held. CNH Industrial N.V. was subsequently listed on both the NYSE and the Milan stock exchange (Mercato Telematico Azionario).

New Holland equipment is manufactured all around the world; the current administrative headquarters are in Turin, Italy, with New Holland, Pennsylvania serving as the brand's headquarters for North America and home of the largest hay tools production facility in the world. With 18 plants spread globally, as well as six joint ventures in the Americas, Asia, and the Middle East, the corporation is present in 170 countries worldwide.[1]

In recent years, the firm has received several awards for its products, designs, and innovative features. Recently, New Holland presented the NH2, a hydrogen-powered tractor farmers can refill by generating energy from renewable sources. New Holland also owns trademarks for specific innovations on its products such as ABS Super Steer system, Opti Fan System, Intellifill system, and others. 

The brand was the main Juventus F.C. sponsor from 2007 to 2010.

History

New Holland history is the sum and integration of four agricultural brands that merged: Ford, Fiat Trattori, Claeys, and New Holland.

New Holland was founded in 1895 by Abe Zimmerman[2] in New Holland, Pennsylvania and was producing agricultural products, including a feed mill, to help the farming community around him (see New Holland Machine Company). In 1947, the company changed its name to Sperry New Holland, due to a take over by the Sperry Rand Corporation. The same year, it made a major breakthrough in hay harvesting technology with the introduction of the haybine mower conditioner. In 1964, Sperry New Holland bought a major interest in Claeys.

Claeys was founded in 1906 by Leon Claeys, a Belgian mechanic. This firm started to build threshing machines, and in 1909, built a factory in Zedelgem, Belgium, where one of New Holland's plants is still producing harvesting products. By the 1960s, Claeys was one of the biggest combine manufacturers in Europe.[3]

In 1975, Sperry New Holland introduced the world's first twin-rotor combine, a successful technology that is still used today.
In 1986, Ford bought Sperry New Holland and formed Ford New Holland Inc.

Before this acquisition, Ford had a long history in agricultural machinery production. In 1907, Ford came out with the prototype for the world's first mass-produced, gasoline-powered tractor, named an ‘automobile plow’. Ten years later, this tractor went into actual production.
It was renamed the Fordson Model F, and produced by a new business, Henry Ford & Son Company. In 1939, Ford introduced the three-point hitch (three-point linkage) on the 'N' tractor series, a very successful tractor family. In the 1980s, Ford was one of the major players, and its tractor division had been responsible for a number of industry innovations, including the use of power hydraulics, rubber pneumatic tires, diesel engines, and the three-point hitch (This hitch was originally developed by Harry Ferguson, but was in wide use on Ford tractors).

In 1991, Fiat purchased an 80% interest in Ford New Holland. Also, Fiat was present in the agriculture machinery industry since the beginning of the 20th century. In 1918, Fiat Model 702 tractor was launched and went into full production a year later at the car and truck plant in Turin, and won the International Ploughing Contest in Senlis (France). Model 702 was the first Fiat agricultural tractor, as well as the first Italian tractor to be built on an industrial scale. In the 1930s, Fiat's founder, Senator Giovanni Agnelli, wanted his tractor to become an integral part of Italy's agriculture, so he began an association with the Italian agricultural co-operatives. The company kept on growing, and by the end of the 1970s, Fiat Trattori had built over a million tractors.

In the 1980s, Fiat acquired Braud, a French company founded in 1870, which introduced the stationary threshers to farmers in Western France in 1895.  In 1975, Braud launched his first grape harvester, model 1020.  This was further improved with Braud 1014, the best-selling grape harvester in the history of the vineyard, with over 2000 units sold in less than four years.

With the purchase of Ford New Holland, New Holland became a global full-line producer and the integration process was completed at the official launch of the brand at the worldwide convention in Orlando, Florida, in 1996.

Under the ownership of Fiat, New Holland N.V. and Case Corporation merged in 1999, giving birth to CNH. Due to antitrust policies, New Holland had to divest Laverda and the Versatile tractor plant in Winnipeg, Manitoba, Canada.

Following the 1993 purchase, the joint venture signed between the Ford Motor Company and the Mexican Quimmco Group in 1990 was transferred to the New Holland company.  In 1999, the name of the company was changed to CNH de México.

New Holland Fiat India Pvt. Ltd., previously New Holland Tractors India (Pvt.) Ltd., was established as a 100% subsidiary of CNH Global NV in 1996. The factory is situated in the Greater Noida area, near New Delhi.

In 1998, New Holland has acquired Bizon, a combine harvester manufacturer based in Płock, Poland. It designed machines for harvesting cereals, rape seed, maize, sunflower seed, and other crops.
Bizon held about 60% of the Polish combine harvester market and had begun sales expansion in Latin America, Pakistan, Belarus, and Ukraine.

In 1998, New Holland signed a joint venture with Türk Traktör, a company belonging to the Koç Group, Turkey's largest industrial conglomerate. The factory based in Ankara was already producing Fiat tractors since the previous joint venture with the Fiat Group dated 1967. In 2011, the factory celebrated the production of its 600 thousandth tractor.

Shanghai New Holland Agricultural Machinery Corporation Ltd. was established on January 1, 2002, as a joint venture bringing together CNH and Shanghai Tractor and Internal Combustion Engine Corporation, an industry leader in the Chinese market. Today, it is one of the China's largest joint ventures for agricultural machinery.

Also in 2002, the New Holland TG tractor series was introduced, and featured the unique "Cat'sEye" lighting as dubbed by then Fiat Chairman Paolo Cantarella. The free-form halogen lighting was a first, not only in tractor design, but also actually preceded the use of this type of lighting in automotive design.  Virtually every tractor produced after this design has been influenced by the original TG model New Holland. The TG was the first styling effort by New Holland's newly named consulting designers and stylists (Montgomery Design International), which had been the long-time firm of record for IH and CaseIH. A single sketch penned by owner and principal designer Gregg Montgomery set New Holland's styling direction, which continues today in the complete range of New Holland tractors.

From 2007 to 2010, New Holland was the sponsor of Juventus F.C. In the same year, tractor number 500,000 rolls off the Jesi production line in Italy. In Paraná State, Brazil, the first machines are delivered to the Programa Trator Solidário (Solidary Tractor). A white T7050 tractor is presented to the Pope Benedictus XVI.

In 2008, New Holland Fiat India produced the 100,000th tractor at its New Delhi plant, 200,000 combines built in Zedelgem, Belgium and 700,000 small square balers in New Holland, PA, US. The rotary combine model, the CR9090 Elevation, was launched and set a new world record for combine harvesting, recognised by Guinness World Records, with 551.6 tonnes of wheat harvested in 8 hours.

In 2009, New Holland Agricultural presented the world's first hydrogen-powered tractor, the NH2.

In 2010, following the finalization of the industrial agreement between CNH and OJSC KAMAZ, the newly formed industrial joint venture had started the assembly of the New Holland new tractor models T9060, T9040, and T8050 and the CSX7080 and CSX7060 combine harvesters at its Naberezhnye Chelny plant in the Republic of Tatarstan, Russia. In 2012, two new products have been added, the T8.330 tractor and the CX8080 combine. In the same year, New Holland celebrated the 150,000th tractor made at its Indian plant at its manufacturing facility in Greater Noida. In Europe, Zedelgem plant celebrated 50 years in the self-propelled forage harvesters sector with the launch of the FR9000 50th Anniversary Limited Edition.

In 2011, TürkTraktör, CNH's joint venture with Koç Holding celebrated the production of its 600,0000th tractor, a New Holland TD 100D. New Holland is a Gold Sponsor of the Climate Action Networking Reception, hosted by Climate Action in partnership with the United Nations Environment Programme (UNEP) and the South African government in Durban.

In 2012, New Holland sponsored the Rio+20 Summit United Nations Conference on Sustainable Development.

Environmental initiatives and innovation projects

NH2 hydrogen-powered tractor and energy-independent farm

New Holland has developed the Energy Independent Farm, a new approach, where farmers are meant to be able to generate their own energy to run their farm and agricultural equipment. The basis of this is the use of hydrogen generated from renewable sources, which farmers have at their disposal: wind, solar, and waste or biomass, according to its availability in each particular farming area. The electricity is then converted into hydrogen using an electrolyser; this technology is used to split water into hydrogen and oxygen gases. Basically, it needs water and electricity as inputs; the hydrogen is then stored at the farm in high-pressure tanks and is ready to be used as a free and clean fuel, which can be used directly in farm machinery or in generators to provide electrical power and heat for buildings and numerous applications. Hydrogen was chosen because it is an efficient energy carrier, it works like a battery, accumulating energy, and it is more advantageous and cleaner than a conventional battery.
The hydrogen-powered NH2 tractor is based on the T6.140 production model. The tractor is able to all operate all the implements required for different seasonal operations: soil preparation, seeding, baling, transport, and front loader applications, while operating virtually silently and emitting only heat, vapour and water Its internal combustion engine has been replaced with fuel cells that generate electricity. The compressed hydrogen stored in a special tank, and reacts with the oxygen in the air inside the cell to generate water and electricity. This powers the electric motors that drive the main transmission and the auxiliary systems of the tractor. The fuel cell generates less heat than an internal-combustion engine, offers a consistent output of power, and does not produce polluting nitrogen oxides, soot particles, or carbon dioxide. It is quicker to refuel, 5 minutes to fill a tank compared to hours required by batteries.

Product specification
 Power: 75 kW (106 hp)
 Transmission: CVT through electrical motor
 PTO: CVT through electrical motor
NH2 Hydrogen Powered Tractor was awarded a Gold Medal for technical innovation at SIMA in 2009.

The hydrogen powered NH2 tractor will be tested at La Bellotta, Turin, Italy, as a pilot to realize the first Energy Independent farm.

100% Biodiesel equipment
New Holland approved the use of Biodiesel in its products since 2006 with the use of 20% Biodiesel (B20) in all of its equipment containing New Holland engines. In 2007, New Holland offered 100% Biodiesel (B100) compatibility with New Holland Tier 3 engines. All Tier 4A ECOBlue SCR engines are compatible with 20% Biodiesel (B20) blends, as long as the biodiesel blend complies with fuel specification EN14214:2009.

Partnership with British Beekeepers’ Association
New Holland has formed a partnership with the British Beekeepers’ Association (BBKA) which has led the campaign to raise funds for research to fully understand the reason why British bee colonies are dying. New Holland will provide funding and will have stands at key agricultural shows and events – where it can raise awareness of the work of the BBKA amongst farmers, land-owners and contractors.

Carbon Footprint Calculator
New Holland has developed an online Carbon Footprint Calculator (called CarbonID calculator), verified by SGS, to calculate the carbon footprint of tractors, either based on annual fuel usage or hours worked. The calculator shows a comparison between the Tier 4A/Stage IIIB and previous engine emissions regulations.

Biomass
New Holland is supporting different projects based on energy production from biomass made from agricultural, industrial and domestic residue and energetic crops:
 A willow wood near Lockerbie, United Kingdom, where the forage harvester FR9090 has been tested and is actually in action to harvest crops without the further need of rework before being taken to the power station
In Gurgaon, near Delhi, Punjab region, India, the A2Z Maintenance & Engineering is producing energy from what were previously considered to be waste products, straw from paddy fields and from cotton, maize and oilseed rape. Over 45 megawatts of electricity are delivered to the national grid. This new usage of agricultural residue also reduces the negative environmental impact of large-scale stubble burning. New Holland is currently operating a fleet of 105 tractors, 45 conventional balers, 15 rakes and 2 mowers.
 In Brazil, New Holland has started a partnership with the Centro de Tecnologia Canavieira (Sugar Cane Technology Centre – CTC) for the production of energy from sugar cane, in the traditional form of ethanol and by transforming sugar cane straw into energy. Two Brazilian test farms use a range of New Holland large square balers, tractors, wind-rowers and bale accumulators.
In Makeni, Sierra Leone, New Holland has started a partnership with Addax Bioenergy. The first portion of the plan, the Makeni Ethanol and Power Project (MEP), entails the establishment of sugarcane estates, an ethanol refinery, a cogeneration plant and the related infrastructure. 9 New Holland medium HP tractors are operated to prepare the land for planting.

Trademarks
New Holland introduced several innovation and patents on its products.

ABS SuperSteer system & Intelligent Trailer Braking System
ABS SuperSteer is an application of ABS technology to tractors, which offers an increased safety, especially when operating on steep hills, and increased tractor manoeuvrability. ABS SuperSteer uses ABS technology to manage each wheel's brake individually. Using a single foot pedal, the ABS SuperSteer allows the tractor to be steered by the brakes. Two orange pedal extensions either side of a single pedal replace the conventional, independent two-pedal arrangement. At low speed, this provides the driver with the same single-wheel steering as a conventional tractor, but automatically disables at higher speeds to prevent accidental application. The ABS SuperSteer function includes tyre slip control and automatic coupling with the steering angle. This allows the tractor to perform tight turning manoeuvres without driver intervention on brakes by pivoting on a braked rear wheel, reducing the turning circle to that of a tractor fitted with a SuperSteer front axle. A driver-selectable amount of slip on the pivoting wheel is allowed to prevent soil damage. The hill holder function improves tractor control on slopes, automatically engaging the brakes to prevent the machine rolling back during hill starts and easing clutch engagement.
The Intelligent Trailer Braking system manages and equalises the braking force exerted on the trailer. When slowing with the transmission or the exhaust brake the trailer brakes are modulated so that the trailer deceleration matches that of the tractor.

The ABS system is assembled at Basildon plant using a dynamic standard operating procedure, this enables any operator to assemble the highly complex assembly made up of around 80 processes and 25 different assembly tools, and this also incorporates a test station to ensure the ABS unit is in perfect working order before fitting to a tractor. This is a ground breaking system using new technologies and 3D Assembly instructions the Project leader is process engineer Howard Turnnidge.

Opti-Fan system

The Opti-Fan system compensates automatically for continuous uphill or downhill gradients in combines. When driving downhill, material moves against gravity and therefore more slowly over the grainpan and top sieve, causing it to remain longer in the cleaning shoe and the layer thickness to increase. More ‘material other than grain' (MOG) remains in the cleaning shoe as the set cleaning fan speed is insufficient to clear the crop. Driving uphill causes the material layer to decrease as it moves more quickly out of the shoe under gravity. The air flow from the fan is too high for the thin layer of material which results in the material travelling too quickly over the top causing increased grain losses. The fan speed control system senses the combine's angle of ascent or descent and automatically adjusts the cleaning fan speed to compensate. The operator sets the level-field fan speed and the system reduces the speed when travelling uphill and increases it downhill to optimise the material layer thickness on the cleaning shoe.
The Opti-Fan system was awarded with a Silver Medal at Agritechnica in 2009.

IntelliFill system
The FR9000's IntelliFill system allows the operator to fill a trailer accurately and with minimal losses, even when visibility is limited. Following a front-to-rear or rear-to-front pattern, the automatic trailer tracking system uses a specialised 3D camera mounted under the spout to guide the crop flow into the trailer. The system ensures a uniform fill whether the trailer is alongside the forage harvester, or following, in the case of starting new fields. The system can accurately control the crop flow trajectory even when operating at night. The spout-mounted sensor creates a distance image of the trailer and its surroundings, based on NIR (near infra red) technology. Unlike conventional mono or stereo camera systems, which have poor depth perception, the New Holland tracking system can accurately position the crop flow to a distance of 20 metres.
IntelliFill system was awarded with a Gold Medal at Agritechnica in 2009.

Super Steer system

The SuperSteer front axle reduces the turn radius of the tractor. The front axle beam turns with the wheels to give an effective turn angle of 65°. The tractor turns tighter and faster so it spends less time turning and more time working. The SuperSteer front axle also increases the wheelbase, with the weight of the front ballast resting directly on the front axle beam. Traction is enhanced in certain conditions without need for extra ballast.

Moistur system
Two star wheels penetrate the bale and provide an accurate measurement of the moisture content; the information about the condition of the crop being baled prevents processing a crop which is not really ready and allows precise application of additives.

Sensitrak 4WD management
Sensitrak traction management monitors the speed differential between the front and rear wheels. If the system detects that the front wheels are slipping, power is automatically directed to the rear wheels. The system reduces wheel slip but not the manoeuvrability. The operator can select permanent 4WD and a manually applied front axle differential lock further boosting traction.

On the move bale weighting system
The weight data is transmitted instantaneously to the monitor in the tractor cab, enabling the operator to keep a constant and accurate check on the progress of baling operations and optimizes the performance of the baler to suit harvesting conditions. This automatic system bale weighing system has an accuracy of +/- 2% and can easily handle different bale size in any kind of crop condition. It is available as a dealer installed accessory.

Edgewrap system

With the New Holland EdgeWrap system, net is brought to the bale by a duckbill net applicator. The system penetrates in the bale chamber for positive wrapping material delivery. The duckbill net applicator is wider than the bale chamber, providing coverage of the bale edge. The use of wide net provides over the edge coverage.

Grain Cam system
A camera recognises the concentration of chaff and broken grain in the sample as it is transferred through the grain elevator to the grain tank; this information is shown on the IntelliView III monitor in the form of a graph, allowing the operator to fine tune adjustments, further boosting grain purity.
Grain Cam was awarded by the Gold Medal for innovation at Agritechnica in 2007.

Opti-Clean cleaning shoe

The Opti-Clean system optimizes the strike and the throwing angles of each of the main components in CR9000 Elevation models. The grain pan is not coupled with the pre-sieve and top sieve so that each element can operate as its optimum efficiency. The cascade distance between the grain pan and the pre-sieve is increased for greater capacity, while a long sieve stroke and a steep throwing angle keep more material airborne, for even a higher cleaning efficiency. The opposing motion of the grain pan and bottom sieve to the pre-sieve reduces overall machine vibrations and increases operator comfort.

Sidewinder
The SideWinder II armrest is a new command control for T6, T7, T8 and T9 tractor ranges. The most frequently used controls have been placed in this armrest to improve ergonomics and productivity.

Crop ID
The Crop ID system records information in real time about every bale. When the bale passes through the chamber, an empty radio frequency ID tag is applied, and when it exits the chamber, and passes off the chute, the information is recorded by the processor, including bale weight, moisture content, date and time and its GPS location. An infrared scanner can then be used to read the tag.

Synchroknife
The SynchroKnife drive technology includes a single, centrally mounted gearbox with double knife drive which ensures lateral weight distribution for more uniform stubble height, as well as significantly reducing knife stress and vibration. Located under the header floor, the edge of the uncut crop is protected from potential snagging caused by bulky side-mounted knife drive gearboxes.

Awards and recognition
In 2014, New Holland released its first ever Class 10 combine, the CR10.90. With 653 hp, it is the largest and most powerful combine on the market. On August 15, 2014 a CR10.90 set a new world record for combine harvesting, recognized by Guinness World Records, with 797.7 tonnes of wheat harvested in eight hours.

On April 5, 2017 a CR8.90 set a new world record for soybean combine harvesting, recognized by the Guinness World Records, with 439.73 tonnes of soybeans harvested in eight hours.

New Holland products received many awards and recognitions during the years. The most recent ones are:

See also 
 New Holland Construction

Notes

References

Stuart Gibbard: The Ford Tractor Story: Basildon to New Holland, 1964 to 1999 (2000)
William Dozza, Massimo Misley: Fiat Trattori. Dal 1918 ad oggi, Giorgio Nada Editore (2008)
William Dozza, Massimo Misley: Fiat Tractors from 1919 to the present (2011)
Micro De Cet: Tractors (Complete Encyclopedia Series) (2009)
C. Otero: Creating the future of the countryside. The European Estate (2009)
Homer K. Luttinger: The Innovators: The New Holland Story, Hoster Bindery Inc.: Lancaster, Penn. (1990)
Robert N. Pripps, Andrew Morland: Ford Tractors (Farm Tractor Color History), MBI Publishing Company (2004)
Chester Peterson, Rod Breemer: Ford N Series Tractor, MBI Publishing Company (1997)
Andrew Morland: Farm Tractors, MBI Publishing Company (1993)
Nick Baldwin: Farm Tractors, Board Book (1983)
Andrew Morland, Robert N. Pripps: Vintage Ford Tractors: The ultimate tribute to Ford, Fordson, Ferguson and New Holland tractors (2004)

External links

 

 CNH Global Corporate Website
 New Holland European Press Kit
 New Holland North America Press Kit 
 New Holland NH2 - Hydrogen-powered tractor in an Energy Independent Farm
 Ricambi New Holland

Manufacturing companies established in 1895
1895 establishments in Pennsylvania
CNH Industrial
Lawn and garden tractors
Tractor manufacturers of the United States
Tractor manufacturers of Italy
Turin motor companies
Manufacturing companies based in Turin
Agricultural machinery manufacturers of the United States
Agricultural machinery manufacturers of Italy